Lisa Byington (born May 18, 1976) is a play-by-play announcer, studio host, and feature producer/reporter. She has broadcast games for Fox Sports, FS1, Big Ten Network, CBS, Turner Sports, Pac-12 Network, ESPN, SEC Network.

Byington has worked primarily as a play-by-play announcer and reporter on FOX Sports and Big Ten Network's coverage of college football and basketball games. In 2017, Byington became the first female play-by-play to call a college football game for the Big Ten Network.

Byington announced the 2019 Women's World Cup for Fox and the 2020 Olympic Games as a play-by-play announcer for men's and women's soccer. Byington has also worked as a sideline reporter for the NCAA men's basketball tournament with CBS and Turner since 2017. On March 19, 2021, she became the first woman to do play-by-play in March Madness history for CBS and Turner Sports.

In 2021 Byington became the first female full-time play-by-play voice for a major men's professional sports team when she became the full time play-by-play announcer of the Milwaukee Bucks. Byington also handles play-by-play work for the WNBA’s Chicago Sky.

Byington, a native of Portage, Michigan, was a two-sport athlete at Northwestern University, playing four years of basketball and two years of soccer. Both teams made the NCAA Tournament.

References

1976 births
Living people
People from Portage, Michigan
American television sports announcers
College football announcers
College basketball announcers in the United States
Northwestern Wildcats women's basketball players
Women sports announcers
Women's college basketball announcers in the United States
Women's National Basketball Association announcers
National Football League announcers
National Basketball Association broadcasters
Milwaukee Bucks announcers
Softball announcers
American women's soccer players
Soccer players from Michigan
Women's association football defenders
Northwestern Wildcats women's soccer players